Hoplojana watsoni is a moth in the family Eupterotidae. It was described by Lucien A. Berger in 1980. It is found in Cameroon, the Central African Republic and the Democratic Republic of the Congo.

References

Janinae
Moths described in 1980